Shahla Arbabi (born 1945) is an Iranian-born American artist and educator. She resides in Washington DC.

Biography 
Arbabi was born in 1945 in Shiraz, Iran. She began painting in childhood.

From 1961 until 1965 she studied at the University of Tehran in the College of Fine Arts, before spending four years at the Accademia di Belle Arti di Roma. She taught art at the University of Tehran in the late 1960s to 1974. After moving to the United States in 1980, she gained her MFA degree in painting and printmaking from American University in 1983.

Arbabi's work is in various public museum collections including the Arthur M. Sackler Gallery, the University of Maryland Art Gallery, among others. Her 1996 mixed-media work, Untitled #2 is owned by the United States Mission to the United Nations, the United States' delegation to the United Nations. During her career she has shown her work at many solo and group exhibitions internationally, both in Europe and the United States.

See also 
 List of Iranian women artists

References 

1945 births
Living people
20th-century Iranian women artists
21st-century Iranian women artists
Iranian expatriates in the United States
Academic staff of the University of Tehran
American University alumni
People from Shiraz
Accademia di Belle Arti di Roma alumni
University of Tehran alumni
Iranian-American culture in Washington, D.C.
American artists of Iranian descent